USS O'Bannon (DD/DDE-450), a , was the second ship of the United States Navy to be named after Lieutenant Presley O'Bannon (1784–1850), the Marine Corps's "hero of Derna".

O'Bannon was the US Navy's most decorated destroyer during World War II, earning 17 battle stars and a Presidential Unit Citation.

Construction and commissioning

O'Bannon was laid down by Bath Iron Works Corp. in Bath, Maine on 3 March 1941, and  launched 19 February 1942, sponsored by Mrs. E. F. Kennedy, descendant of Lieutenant O'Bannon. O'Bannon and her sister ship  were the first two Fletchers to be launched. O'Bannon was commissioned at Boston on 26 June 1942.

1942 

O'Bannon briefly trained for war in the Caribbean and sailed from Boston on 29 August 1942 for the Southwest Pacific, where the long and arduous Guadalcanal campaign had just begun. For over a year, the Navy—stretched thin to cover its worldwide commitments at a period when new ships were just beginning to join the fleet in any number—was to fight and fight again in the Solomon Islands in one of the most bitterly contested campaigns of history, wresting air and sea control from the Japanese and providing the Marine Corps and the Army with every possible support as they gained ground inch by inch on the myriad islands. Assigned the Destroyer Squadron 21 (DesRon 21), O'Bannon played a valiant part in these endeavors, winning a Presidential Unit Citation.

Based at Nouméa, New Caledonia, O'Bannon first escorted the escort carrier  on a run to Guadalcanal, where on 9 October, twenty Marines flew their Grumman F4F Wildcats off Copahees decks, desperately needed as reinforcements at beleaguered Henderson Field. Through the remainder of the month, O'Bannon sailed the New Hebrides and southern Solomons on escort duty. On 7 November at Nouméa, she joined Rear Admiral Daniel J. Callaghan's Support Group, ready to sail with a convoy carrying critical reinforcements, replacements, food, ammunition, and aviation material.

On the approach to Guadalcanal, O'Bannon sighted and fired on a surfaced enemy submarine, holding it down while the convoy passed safely. On the afternoon of 12 November, the partially unladen transports were attacked by sixteen enemy torpedo bombers; eleven were shot down. O'Bannon fired on four of the enemy planes.

Now came word that the Japanese were moving south in force. Two battleships, a light cruiser, and 14 destroyers were bound to destroy Henderson Field by bombardment, to break up the American reinforcement mission, and to cover reinforcement movements of their own. O'Bannon and the other ships of the Support Force, two heavy and three light cruisers and eight destroyers, confronted the greatly superior enemy early on 13 November in Ironbottom Sound, so named for the number of ships on both sides sunk there during the Guadalcanal campaign. O'Bannons gunfire, in combination with the attacks of the rest of the force, damaged Hiei so badly that she was a sitting duck for the air attack, which forced her scuttling the next day.

This first engagement of the Naval Battle of Guadalcanal was short but furious; two American light cruisers, in one of which Rear Admiral Norman Scott lost his life, and four destroyers were lost, while two Japanese destroyers were sunk, and Hiei prepared for her doom. Above all, the Japanese were turned back, and Henderson Field was saved from destruction. The importance of this success is illustrated by the fact that the next day, Henderson aviators sank seven enemy troop transports attempting to reinforce the island and turned back four more transports that were destroyed soon after.

Through October 1942, O'Bannon protected landings, carried out escort duties from Nouméa and Espiritu Santo to Guadalcanal and Tulagi, joined in bombardments at Guadalcanal, Munda, and Kolombangara, and shouldered her share of the nightly patrols up "the Slot", guarding against Japanese reinforcements.

1943 

A Navy legend holds that in April O'Bannon sighted a Japanese submarine on the surface and opened fire. The submarine pulled alongside the destroyer close enough that the destroyer's guns could not hit it. Several different versions of the story say that the sailors on the destroyer pelted the submarine crew with potatoes. Commander Donald MacDonald only said that the submarine was so close, the destroyer's cook believed that he could throw a potato at it. Although MacDonald has repeatedly claimed that no potatoes were actually thrown, the story of an American destroyer sinking a Japanese submarine with potatoes was picked up by the media and was so quickly spread throughout navy lore that many still believe it to this day. A plaque commemorating the incident was on display at the Maine Maritime Museum until the 1970s but then went missing.

War duty was tense and demanded the best of men and their ships. In-port time was minimal; a few hours to fuel and reprovision, and the ships were off again. O'Bannon fought in many surface actions. The Battle of Kula Gulf (6 July), in which O'Bannon fought with three cruisers and three other destroyers against ten Japanese destroyers, swept the enemy from the area, though an American cruiser was lost. A week later, the Battle of Kolombangara had to be fought in the same waters against a Japanese cruiser, five destroyers and four destroyer escorts.

For the next two months, O'Bannon spent most of her time in Vella Gulf, guarding landings, intercepting Japanese troop convoys and their covering escorts, and fighting off air attacks. With the aid of sister destroyers, she sank a number of barges, two submarine chasers (Cha-5 and Cha-12), an armed boat, and a gunboat on various patrols. The climax of operations in the area was the Battle of Vella Lavella on 6 October, brought on by Japanese attempts to evacuate their troops from that island. The three American ships contacted six enemy destroyers, shrugged at the odds, and raced at 33 knots (61 km/h) to launch torpedoes and open gunfire. The  was turned into a blazing hulk, but both Selfridge and Chevalier took torpedo hits. O'Bannon was close on Chevaliers stern when the latter was struck, and the most radical maneuvers could not keep her from swinging into her sister's side. The enemy retired with three newly arrived American destroyers in pursuit, while O'Bannon guarded her stricken sisters, rescuing the survivors of Chevalier.

1944 

O'Bannon made battle repairs at Tulagi, then sailed to the west coast for overhaul. By 18 March 1944, she was back in the Solomons, ready for her part in the series of westward-moving amphibious assaults that won New Guinea. Again, it was escort and bombardment repeatedly until 18 October, when O'Bannon cleared Hollandia to escort reinforcements for the invasion of Leyte. The convoy was brought in safely on 24 October, the eve of the Battle for Leyte Gulf. O'Bannon guarded the Northern Transport area and patrolled the entrances to Leyte Gulf during the battle, coming under air attack. Thus, she played her part in the definitive destruction of the Japanese Navy.

1945 

Through June 1945 O'Bannon operated primarily in the Philippines, serving in the escort or assault force for the long roll call of invasions: Ormoc Bay, Mindoro, Lingayen Gulf, Bataan, Corregidor, Palawan, Zamboanga, Cebu, and Caraboa. Air attacks were frequent in the early period, and O'Bannon splashed several raiders. During the Lingayen offensive on 31 January 1945, O'Bannon, with three other destroyers, attacked and sank an enemy submarine; Japanese records studied after the war indicate it was most likely . At the end of April and early in May, O'Bannon interrupted her Philippine operations to give fire support at Tarakan, Borneo, and cover minesweeping operations there.

O'Bannon rendezvoused with a group of escort carriers off Okinawa on 17 June and guarded them as they struck against Sakishima Gunto. In July, she protected the large carriers as they flew strikes on northern Honshū and Hokkaidō. There, she patrolled until 1 September. She then sailed to San Francisco and San Diego, where she was decommissioned after overhaul on 21 May 1946.

1949–1962 

Between 17 January 1949 and 10 February 1950, O'Bannon was converted to an escort destroyer at Long Beach Naval Shipyard. She was redesignated DDE-450 on 26 March 1949.

O'Bannon was recommissioned on 19 February 1951 to serve out of Pearl Harbor. She sailed for her first tour of duty with the United Nations forces repelling Communist aggression in Korea on 19 November, and, during the next seven months, she guarded carriers at sea as their air groups struck targets in Korea; served as flagship for the Wonsan Element, East Coast Blockade and Escort Group; fired on enemy gun emplacements, road and rail supply routes, ammunition depots, and troop concentrations; and protected convoys moving between Korea and Japan.

A training period out of Pearl Harbor began upon her return home on 20 June 1952, and she took part in U.S. Atomic Energy Commission operations off Eniwetok. O'Bannon cleared Pearl Harbor late in April 1953 for the Far East, where her primary mission was screening carriers. Thereafter, she served on the Taiwan Patrol and in exercises off Japan and Okinawa.

Between the Korean War and the Vietnam War, O'Bannon took her part in the intricately planned schedule that assured the United States that its 7th Fleet was always composed of ships and men whose readiness for any emergency was at its keenest. For O'Bannon, this meant an alternation of roughly six-month deployments to the Far East and periods spent in training operations and necessary overhauls at Pearl Harbor. While in the Far East, she visited ports in Japan, the Philippines, Taiwan, Australia and New Zealand, with brief, welcome recreation calls at Hong Kong. She was often in either New Zealand or Australia for the annual commemoration of the Battle of the Coral Sea, a time of national rejoicing in those countries at which Americans are particularly welcome. She conducted combined operations training with the SEATO allies as well as exercising with Marines at Okinawa and taking part in exercises preparing for any conceivable demand that might be made on the 7th Fleet. While at Pearl Harbor, she often aided in training reservists in addition to her own training and, at various times, sailed down-range for space orbits and missile shots. In the summer and fall of 1962, she took part in atomic tests at Johnston Island.

1964–1970 

In 1964, O'Bannon took part in the 1965 film In Harm's Way.  At 9:00 into the film, as Kirk Douglas' character is welcoming a new transport, O'Bannon is seen full length in the background.  Its hull number 450 can be seen somewhat obscured on the starboard bow.

O'Bannon first closed the coast of Vietnam during her 1964–65 deployment, when, on 26 December, she left Hong Kong to patrol and conduct hydrographic surveys. Much of her 1966 tour was spent as plane guard for the aircraft carrier , while the carrier's jets struck targets in South and North Vietnam to lessen Communist ability to wage war in the South. For a week each in May and June, O'Bannon fired shore bombardments, destroying Vietcong base camps, troop concentrations, and small craft.

The veteran destroyer returned via Yokosuka to Pearl Harbor on 30 July. During operations out of home port, she trained for Apollo space craft recovery operations in August and was a member of the contingency recovery force for the Gemini 11 space flight early in September. She visited Guam in the spring of 1967 and returned home early in July to prepare for another Far Eastern deployment.

O'Bannon got under way for Japan on 28 September and reached Yokosuka on 7 October and Subic Bay on the 15th. She returned to the war zone with the carrier  and operated as plane guard on Yankee Station through 4 November. After a fortnight's respite at Subic Bay and Hong Kong, O'Bannon sailed to Da Nang for shore bombardment. She visited Taiwan early in December but returned to the fighting on the 15th to provide gunfire support just south of the DMZ. Two days later, she helped to rescue the crew of an American plane that had been hit over the DMZ and had managed to crash just off shore. An enemy battery shelled the destroyer during the operation but failed to score. As 1967 ended, O'Bannon was still on the gun line supporting allied ground forces.

On 30 January 1970, O'Bannon was decommissioned in a ceremony at Pearl Harbor (side-by-side with her sister Nicholas, as at their launching) and stricken from the Navy List. She was sold for scrap on 6 June 1970 and broken up two years later.

O'Bannon received the Presidential Unit Citation and 17 battle stars for World War II service, placing her among the most decorated US ships of World War II. She also received three more battle stars for service during the Korean War. Nicknamed the "Lucky O", none of her crew was awarded the Purple Heart.

Quotes

Awards

See also 
CDR George Philip Jr., served on O'Bannon (1942–43), as the Executive officer, Navigator and Combat Intelligence Officer. Received the Silver Star for service 10 January 1943 to 6 April 1943 aboard O'Bannon.

References

External links 

USS O'Bannon website at Destroyer History Foundation
"The Maine Potato Episode"
  history.navy.mil: USS O'Bannon
  navsource.org: USS O'Bannon
   hazegray.org: USS O'Bannon

 

World War II destroyers of the United States
Cold War destroyers of the United States
Korean War destroyers of the United States
Vietnam War destroyers of the United States
Ships built in Bath, Maine
1942 ships
Fletcher-class destroyers of the United States Navy